Damond Jiniya is an American vocalist, lyricist and author. He was born December 16, 1974, in Palm Springs, California. His most notable work was fronting the prog metal band Savatage. Damond also achieved international notoriety with his electro-metal band Diet of Worms.. He recorded with Lover of Sin (Christian Death). Damond has performed at festivals such as Wacken Open Air (DE), Graspop (BE), "Gods of Metal (IT) and the Dracfest UK. He has been featured worldwide in publications such as NME (U.K), Metal Edge (U.S.A), Rock Hard (DE), Metal Maniacs (U.S.A), Aardschok (NL) and most recently Roadie Crew (Brazil). In early 2022 he published 2 full literary books. "Anarchist Poems" and "Amerikan Family Ultra". In Oct. 2022 Damond launched his unique brand of children's music books. journals and activity books " Jiniya Notebooks"

Early life 
Damond was born in Palm Springs, California Dec 16th, 1974. He comes from a family of performers. His grandmother, mother, sister and niece all sing professionally. His mother was a country singer. He joined his mother onstage at age 2 and became part of her show. Damond traveled the United States extensively with her throughout most of his childhood, living in New Hampshire, Tennessee, Washington, Arizona, Nevada and Florida. He put together his first band at age 12 in Nashville, TN.

Diet of Worms (1996-2004) 
Damond founded Diet of Worms with guitarist, producer Juan "Punchy" Gonzalez in 1996. They recorded a demo entitled "Diet of Worms" The demo was well received by critics and fans alike. The duo quickly went on the road with acts such as Godhead (band), Mortiis, Switchblade Symphony and Christian Death touring the U.S., Canada, Mexico and Europe (1997–2003) DOW became a trio in 1998 adding Christian Death drummer Steven "Divine" Wright. The band played their last show in Haarlem, NL in 2003. Diet of Worms disbanded in 2004 citing personal differences. DOW recorded 3 studio albums and 1 EP.

Savatage (2001-202?) 
Damond joined Savatage in March 2001 after the departure of their former lead vocalist Zachary Stevens. Damond traveled extensively with Savatage to support their 2001 release Poets and Madmen. The band headlined in Europe, Brazil, and the U.S.A. They also played/headlined festivals with Suicidal Tendencies, Megadeth, W.A.S.P., Bruce Dickinson, Living Colour, Motörhead etc. In 2001 they opened for Judas Priest in Europe on their "Demolition" tour. There were immediate plans to record a follow up record, but Savatage went on indefinite hiatus in 2003 and the album was never recorded. Having never been officially fired. Damond remains the final contracted singer of Savatage.

Various Projects (2005-Present) 
After his departure from Savatage in 2010, Damond briefly took up acting. He starred in a low budget independent film called Chasing the Tiger with Jennifer Karnes. He released his fifth studio album called The Neglected in 2005. In 2006 Damond released "Starclone". In 2008 he released "Nebulas on Doomsday". Damond released  his 8th international independent recording "Herman Nebula" in 2013. Damond was featured on blabbermouth.com, Roadie Crew, Metalsucks and Brave Words online. In a 2018 interview, he mentioned that he was working on two books including a poetry/biography and a fictional piece. In 2018 he formed Blackbird Sanctuary Media. In 2019 he released two full length recordings "Dreaming of Snakes" and "Down the Tracks" In 2020, he and his wife developed Earth Stone Spirit.com. This is a successful online everything store. In 2020 he celebrated 20 years as a successful vocal coach (since 2000) in 2022 Damond has become an online influencer for TikTok, youtube and Cameo.com. In 2022, Damond wrote and released his first book " Anarchist Poems" worldwide in Feb. 

He released "Amerikan Family Ultra" ( his first work of fiction) on Easter black '22.

Books 
Anarchist Poems (2021) American Family Ultra(2022) Discography 
Diet of Worms (1996)
To Thine Own Self (1997)
Aquarius (1999)
Tantrumland (2004)The Neglected (2005)
Starclone (2006)
Nebulas on Doomsday (2008)
Herman/Nebula (2014)
Fake New Flyers EP (2018)
Down the Tracks (2020)
Dreaming of Snakes (2021)
Muscleboy (DUE OUT Dec.16th 2023)

 Compilations Black Sunshine 2 (Cleopatra Records)1er. Festival Oscuro'' (Dilemma Records MX)

References

External links 
 Ex-SAVATAGE Singer DAMOND JINIYA Breaks Silence, Says He Was 'Left In The Cold'
 Encyclopaedia Mettalum entry on Damond Jiniya
 Interview with Savatage by Imaginessa
 Biographic details on Damond Jiniya on metal-metropolis.com
 JON OLIVA: Singer DAMOND JINIYA Is Still An Active Member Of SAVATAGE
 Chasing the Tiger 3 starring Damond Jiniya and Jennifer Karnes
 http://www.bravewords.com/news/52456
 Damond Jiniya, ex de Savatage, rompe su silencio (Damond Jiniya, ex-Savatage member breaks the silence)
 http://www.music-reviewer.com/10_01/savatage.htm
 http://www.resurrection.at/archivneu/inties/savatage_intie.htm
 Transcripts of Savatage songs on The Neglected album
 http://www.roadrunnerrecords.com/BLABBERMOUTH.NET/news.aspx?mode=Article&newsitemID=34416
 http://www.metalunderground.com/news/details.cfm?newsid=12724
 http://www.speed-n-power.com/disk.php?did=10845
 http://www.savatage.com/bandinfo_new/members/damondjiniya.html
 http://www.roadrunnerrecords.com/Blabbermouth.net/news.aspx?mode=Article&newsitemID=21055
 https://web.archive.org/web/20090901154021/http://www.roadrunnerrecords.com/blabbermouth.net/news.aspx?mode=Article&newsitemID=9734
 https://www.amazon.com/s?k=d.+michael+o%27connor&i=stripbooks&crid=2ZWTUDQ71ZEVT&sprefix=%2Cstripbooks%2C241&ref=nb_sb_ss_recent_1_0_recent

1974 births
Living people
Musicians from Palm Springs, California
American lyricists
American writers
Singers from California
Songwriters from California
21st-century American singers
21st-century American male singers
American male songwriters